The Embassy of Azerbaijan in Moscow is the diplomatic mission of the Republic of Azerbaijan to the Russian Federation. It is located at 16 Leontyevsky Lane in the Presnensky District of Moscow.

See also 
 Azerbaijan–Russia relations
 Diplomatic missions in Russia

References

External links 
 Embassy of Azerbaijan, official website

Azerbaijan
Moscow
Azerbaijan–Russia relations